Carnegie Hall is a live album by flautist Hubert Laws recorded at Carnegie Hall in New York City in 1973 and released on the CTI label.

Reception
The Allmusic review by Scott Yanow awarded the album 4 stars stating "This interesting live set features flutist Hubert Laws at the height of his powers and fame".

Track listing
 "Windows/Fire and Rain" (Chick Corea/James Taylor) - 15:30 
 "Passacaglia in C Minor" (Johann Sebastian Bach) - 20:42 
Recorded at Carnegie Hall in New York City on January 12, 1973

Personnel
Hubert Laws - flute 
Bob James - electric piano
Gene Bertoncini - guitar
Ron Carter - bass
Billy Cobham, Freddie Waits - drums 
Dave Friedman - vibraphone
Don Sebesky - arranger
Dave Miller - bassoon

References

1973 albums
CTI Records live albums
Hubert Laws albums
Albums produced by Creed Taylor
Albums arranged by Don Sebesky
Albums recorded at Carnegie Hall